AIDS Coalition to Unleash Power (ACT UP) is an international, grassroots political group working to end the AIDS pandemic. The group works to improve the lives of people with AIDS through direct action, medical research, treatment and advocacy, and working to change legislation and public policies.

ACT UP was formed on March 12, 1987, at the Lesbian and Gay Community Services Center in New York City. Larry Kramer was asked to speak as part of a rotating speaker series, and his well-attended speech focused on action to fight AIDS. Kramer spoke out against the current state of the Gay Men's Health Crisis (GMHC), which he perceived as politically impotent. Kramer had co-founded the GMHC but had resigned from its board of directors in 1983. According to Douglas Crimp, Kramer posed a question to the audience: "Do we want to start a new organization devoted to political action?" The answer was "a resounding yes." Approximately 300 people met two days later to form ACT UP.

At the Second National March on Washington for Lesbian and Gay Rights, in October 1987, ACT UP New York made their debut on the national stage, as an active and visible presence in both the march, the main rally, and at the civil disobedience at the United States Supreme Court Building the following day.  Inspired by this new approach to radical, direct action, other participants in these events returned home to multiple cities and formed local ACT UP chapters in Boston, Chicago, Los Angeles, Rhode Island, San Francisco, Washington, D.C., and other locations. ACT UP spread internationally. In many countries separate movements arose based on the American model. For example, the famous gay rights activist Rosa von Praunheim co-founded ACT UP in Germany.

ACT UP New York actions

Much of the documentation chronicling ACT UP's history is drawn from Douglas Crimp's history of ACT UP, the ACT UP Oral History Project, and the online Capsule History of ACT UP, New York.

Wall Street
On March 24, 1987, 250 ACT UP members demonstrated at Wall Street and Broadway to demand greater access to experimental AIDS drugs and for a coordinated national policy to fight the disease.  An op-ed article by Larry Kramer published in The New York Times the previous day described some of the issues ACT UP was concerned with.  Seventeen ACT UP members were arrested during this civil disobedience.

On March 24, 1988, ACT UP returned to Wall Street for a larger demonstration in which over 100 people were arrested.

On September 14, 1989, seven ACT UP members infiltrated the New York Stock Exchange and chained themselves to the VIP balcony to protest the high price of the only approved AIDS drug, AZT. The group displayed a banner that read, "SELL WELLCOME" referring to the pharmaceutical sponsor of AZT, Burroughs Wellcome, which had set a price of approximately $10,000 per patient per year for the drug, well out of reach of nearly all HIV positive persons. Several days following this demonstration, Burroughs Wellcome lowered the price of AZT to $6,400 per patient per year.

General Post Office
ACT UP held their next action at the New York City General Post Office on the night of April 15, 1987, to an audience of people filing last minute tax returns. This event also marked the beginning of the conflation of ACT UP with the Silence=Death Project, which created a poster consisting of a right side up pink triangle (an upside-down pink triangle was used to mark gays in Nazi concentration camps) on a black background with the text "SILENCE = DEATH." Douglas Crimp said this demonstration showed the "media savvy" of ACT UP because the television media "routinely do stories about down-to-the-wire tax return filers." As such, ACT UP was virtually guaranteed media coverage.

Cosmopolitan magazine
In January 1988, Cosmopolitan magazine published an article by Robert E. Gould, a psychiatrist, entitled "Reassuring News About AIDS: A Doctor Tells Why You May Not Be At Risk." The main contention of the article was that in unprotected vaginal sex between a man and a woman who both had "healthy genitals" the risk of HIV transmission was negligible, even if the male partner was infected. Women from ACT UP who had been having informal "dyke dinners" met with Dr. Gould in person, questioning him about several misleading facts (that penis to vagina transmission is impossible, for example) and questionable journalistic methods (no peer review, bibliographic information, failing to disclose that he was a psychiatrist and not a practitioner of internal medicine), and demanded a retraction and apology. When he refused, in the words of Maria Maggenti, they decided that they "had to shut down Cosmo." According to those who were involved in organizing the action, it was significant in that it was the first time the women in ACT UP organized separately from the main body of the group. Additionally, filming the action itself, the preparation and the aftermath were all consciously planned and resulted in a video short directed by Jean Carlomusto and Maria Maggenti, titled, "Doctor, Liars, and Women: AIDS Activists Say No To Cosmo." The action consisted of approximately 150 activists protesting in front of the Hearst Building (parent company of Cosmopolitan) chanting "Say no to Cosmo!" and holding signs with slogans such as "Yes, the Cosmo Girl CAN get AIDS!" Although the action did not result in any arrests, it brought significant television media attention to the controversy surrounding the article. Phil Donahue, Nightline, and a local talk show called "People Are Talking" all hosted discussions of the article. On the latter, two women, Chris Norwood and Denise Ribble took the stage after the host, Richard Bey, cut Norwood off during an exchange about whether heterosexual women are at risk from AIDS. Footage from all of these media appearances was edited into "Doctors, Liars, and Women." Cosmopolitan eventually issued a partial retraction of the contents of the article.

Women and the CDC'S AIDS Definition
Following their participation in the Cosmopolitan protest, ACT UP's Women's Caucus targeted the Center for Disease Control for its narrow definition of what constituted HIV/AIDS. While causes of HIV transmission, like unprotected vaginal or anal sex, were similar among both men and women, the symptoms of the virus varied greatly. As historian Jennifer Brier noted, "for men, full-blown AIDS often caused Kaposi's sarcoma, while women experienced bacterial pneumonia, pelvic inflammatory disease, and cervical cancer." Since the CDC's definition did not account for such symptoms as a result of AIDS, American women in the 1980s were often diagnosed with AIDS Related Complex (or ARC) or HIV. "In this process," Brier explained, "these women effectively were denied the Social Security benefits that men with AIDS had fought hard to secure, and won, in the late 1980s."
In October 1990, attorney Theresa McGovern filed suit representing 19 New Yorkers who claimed they were unfairly denied disability benefits because of the CDC's narrow definition of AIDS. At an October 2, 1990, protest to raise attention for McGovern's lawsuit, two hundred ACT UP protesters gathered in Washington and chanted "How many more have to die before you say they qualify," and carried posters to the rally with the tagline "Women Don't Get AIDS/ They Just Die From It."
The CDC's initial reaction to calls of the revising the AIDS definition included setting the threshold of AIDS for both men and women at a T cell count of under 200. However, McGovern dismissed this suggestion. "Lots of women who show up at hospitals don't get T cells taken. No one knows they have HIV. I knew how many of our clients were dying of AIDS and not counted."  Rather, McGovern, along with the ACLU and the New Jersey Women and AIDS Network, called for adding fifteen conditions to the list of the CDC's surveillance case definition, which was eventually adopted in January 1993. Six months later, the Clinton administration revised federal criteria for evaluating HIV status and making it easier for women with AIDS to secure Social Security benefits. The Women's Caucus's role in altering the CDC's definition helped to not only drastically increase availability of federal benefits to American women, but helped uncover a more accurate number of HIV/AIDS infected women in the United States; "under the new model, the number of women with AIDS in the United States increased almost 50 percent."

Members of the ACT UP Women's Caucus collectively authored a handbook for two teach-ins held prior to the 1989 CDC demonstration, where ACT UP members learned about issues motivating the action. The handbook, edited by Maria Maggenti, formed the basis for the ACT UP/New York Women and AIDS Book Group's book titled Women, AIDS and Activism, edited by Cynthia Chris and Monica Pearl, and assembled by Marion Banzhaf, Kim Christensen, Alexis Danzig, Risa Denenberg, Zoe Leonard, Deb Levine, Rachel (Sam) Lurie, Catherine Saalfield (Gund), Polly Thistlethwaite, Judith Walker, and Brigitte Weil. The book was published in Spanish in 1993 titled La Mujer, el SIDA, y el Activismo. Members of the original Women and AIDS Handbook Group included Amy (Jamie) Bauer, Heidi Dorow, Ellen Neipris, Ann Northrop, Sydney Pokorney, Karen Ramspacher, Maxine Wolfe, and Brian Zabcik.

FDA
On October 11, 1988, ACT UP had one of its most successful demonstrations (both in terms of size and in terms of national media coverage) when it successfully shut down the Food & Drug Administration (FDA) for a day.  Media reported that it was the largest such demonstration since demonstrations against the Vietnam War.

Among the protestors was artist David Wojnarowicz, then HIV/AIDS positive, wearing painted jean jacket that read: "If I die of AIDS—forget burial—just drop my body on the steps of the F.D.A."— a nascent meme. At this action, activists demonstrated their thorough knowledge of the FDA drug approval process. ACT UP presented precise demands for changes that would make experimental drugs available more quickly, and more fairly. "The success of SEIZE CONTROL OF THE FDA can perhaps best be measured by what ensued in the year following the action. Government agencies dealing with AIDS, particularly the FDA and NIH, began to listen to us, to include us in decision-making, even to ask for our input."

"Stop the Church"

ACT UP disagreed with Cardinal John Joseph O'Connor on the Roman Catholic Archdiocese's public stand against safe sex education in New York City Public Schools, condom distribution, the Cardinal's public condemnation of homosexuality, as well as the Church's opposition to abortion. This led to the first Stop the Church protest on December 10, 1989, at St. Patrick's Cathedral, New York.

Originally, the plan was just to be a "die-in" during the homily but it descended into "pandemonium." A few dozen activists interrupted Mass, chanted slogans, blew whistles, "kept up a banchee screech," chained themselves to pews, threw condoms in the air, waved their fists, and lay down in the aisles to stage a "die-in." While O'Connor went on with mass, activists stood up and announced why they were protesting. One protester, "in a gesture large enough for all to see," desecrated the Eucharist by spitting it out of his mouth, crumbling it into pieces, and dropping them to the floor.

One hundred and eleven protesters were arrested, including 43 inside the church. Some who refused to move had to be carried out of the church on stretchers. The protests were widely condemned by public and church officials, members of the public, the mainstream media, and some in the gay community.

Saint Vincent's Catholic Medical Center

In the 1980s, as the gay population of Greenwich Village and New York began succumbing to the AIDS virus, Saint Vincent's Catholic Medical Center established the first AIDS Ward on the East Coast and second only to one in San Francisco, and soon became "Ground Zero" for the AIDS-afflicted in NYC. The hospital "became synonymous" with care for AIDS patients in the 1980s, particularly poor gay men and drug users. It became one of the best hospitals in the state for AIDS care with a large research facility and dozens of doctors and nurses working on it.

ACT UP protested the hospital one night in the 1980s due to its Catholic nature. They took over the emergency room and covered crucifixes with condoms. Their intent was both to raise awareness and offend Catholics. Instead of pressing charges, the sisters who ran the hospital decided to meet with the protesters to better understand their concerns.

Storm the NIH
On May 21, 1990, around 1000 ACT UP members initiated a choreographed demonstration at the National Institutes of Health (NIH) in Bethesda, Maryland, splitting into sub-groups across the campus. The protest was in part directed at National Institute of Allergy and Infectious Disease and its director, Anthony Fauci. Activists were angered by what they felt was slow progress on promised research and treatment efforts. According to Kramer, this was their best demonstration, but was almost completely ignored by the media because of a large fire in Washington, D.C., on the same day.

Day of Desperation
On January 22, 1991, during Operation Desert Storm, ACT UP activist John Weir and two other activists entered the studio of the CBS Evening News at the beginning of the broadcast. They shouted "AIDS is news. Fight AIDS, not Arabs!" and Weir stepped in front of the camera before the control room cut to a commercial break. The same night ACT UP demonstrated at the studios of the MacNeil/Lehrer Newshour. The next day activists displayed banners in Grand Central Terminal that said "Money for AIDS, not for war" and "One AIDS death every 8 minutes."  One of the banners was handheld and displayed across the train timetable and the other attached to bundles of balloons that lifted it up to the ceiling of the station's enormous main room. These actions were part of a coordinated protest called "Day of Desperation."

Seattle schools
In December 1991, ACT UP's Seattle chapter distributed over 500 safer-sex packets outside Seattle high schools.  The packets contained a pamphlet titled "How to Fuck Safely," which was photographically illustrated and included two men performing fellatio.  The Washington state legislature subsequently passed a "Harmful to Minors" law making it illegal to distribute sexually explicit material to underage persons.

Macy's Herald Square
On November 29, 1991, the Black Friday shopping day, ACT UP activists dressed in Santa Claus costumes chained themselves inside Macy's flagship Herald Square department store to protest the store's decision not to rehire an HIV-positive Santa, Mark Woodley. They sang protest Christmas songs with lyrics such as, "Santa Claus has HIV, fa-la-la-la-la-la-la-la-la/Macy's won't rehire he, fa-la-la-la-la-la-la-la-la." Nineteen activists were arrested at the action.

Boston and New England
"In January 1988, [ACT UP/Boston] held its first protest at the Boston offices of the Department of Health and Human Services, regarding delays and red tape surrounding approval of AIDS treatment drugs. ACT UP/Boston's agenda included demands for a compassionate and comprehensive national policy on AIDS; a national emergency AIDS project; intensified drug testing, research, and treatment efforts; and a full-scale national educational program within reach of all. The organization held die-ins and sleep-ins, provided freshman orientation for Harvard Medical School students, negotiated successfully with a major pharmaceutical corporation, affected state and national AIDS policies, pressured health care insurers to provide coverage for people with AIDS, influenced the thinking of some of the nation's most influential researchers, served on the Massachusetts committee that created the nation's first online registry of clinical trials for AIDS treatments, distributed information and condoms to the congregation at Cardinal Bernard Francis Law's Confirmation Sunday services at Holy Cross Cathedral in Boston, and made aerosolized pentamidine an accessible treatment in New England."

In February 1988 ACT UP Boston, in collaboration with ACT UP New York, Mass ACT OUT, and Cure Aids Now demonstrated at both the Democratic and Republican presidential debates and primaries in New Hampshire, and at other events during the presidential race.

During an ordination of priests in Boston in 1990, ACT UP and the Massachusetts Coalition for Lesbian and Gay Civil Rights chanted and protested outside during the service.  The protesters marched, chanted, blew whistles, and sounded airhorns to disrupt the ceremony.  They also threw condoms at people as they left the ordination and were forced to stay back behind police and police barricades.  One man was arrested.  The demonstration was condemned by Leonard P. Zakim, among others.

Los Angeles 

ACT UP Los Angeles (ACT UP/LA) was founded December 4, 1987, and continued holding demonstrations until the early 2000s. During their run they tackled healthcare access, political issues related to LGBTQ civil rights, and supported national ACT UP campaigns.

Some of their more local work focused on policy regarding the migration of HIV-positive people into the U.S., pushing for AIDS clinical trials,  promoting needle exchange programs for intravenous drug users, and surveying speaking out against discrimination by health care and insurance providers. They were effective in distributing their research on Antiviral Therapy (AZT), local and international actions, and updates on the different caucuses through their ACT UP/LA newsletter. The newsletter also served as both an educational outreach and fundraising tool.

Memorable actions by ACT UP/LA are the protests and demonstrations in county-based locations such as the USC county hospital, Los Angeles County Board of Supervisors, and the Los Angeles County Department of Health Services. ACT UP/LA and about fifteen other organizations formed an "Alternative Budget Coalition," rented the Los Angeles County Board of Supervisors' meeting room, and held a mock hearing on the county's $10+ billion budget, saying it spent too little on fighting AIDS. Prominent activists in this period included Connie Norman, one of the people who led ACT UP's push for a bill (AB101) to protect workers from being fired because of their sexuality, California governor Pete Wilson's veto of which led to the AB101 Veto Riot. ACT UP/LA and its associated Women's Caucus put on a “Week of Outrage” in conjunction with the national organization, which consisted of demonstrations, a teach-in, safe-sex vending event.

Women's Caucus ACT UP/LA
The Women's Caucus (WC) of ACT UP/LA served an important collaboration between men and women who were being affected by HIV and AIDS. WC within the ACT UP/LA organization was unique because in this chapter they had a significant amount of control over how they included women's issues into the organizations larger gay male actions. Men were present in the WC, but only as allies, which harvested a collaboration for effective actions, rallies, and any acts of resistance for the whole organization as a whole. While the collaboration was not always perfect, at the end it created a stronger force against discrimination of HIV+ people in Los Angeles.

Some of the work that the WC did was distribute statistical information about women who are HIV+, the lack of appropriate screening and health care access, information about safer sex practices (in English and Spanish), as well as acts of action to push for better. Lauren Leary was an integral in the organization because her worked revolved around gathering existing research about HIV and AIDS in women and men and current treatment options. An ACT UP national collective of women came together to create the “Women's Treatment and Research Agenda” in 1991.

Washington D.C.

Giant condom over Senator's home
Peter Staley and other activists affiliated with ACT-UP wrapped the Arlington, Virginia home of Senator Jesse Helms in a 15-foot condom on September 5, 1991. The protest condemned the Helms AIDS Amendments, which continued to block funding for education, as well as his ongoing opposition to People With AIDS, including numerous homophobic falsehoods about HIV and AIDS. Helms had actively passed laws stigmatizing the disease, and his staunch attempts to block federal funding for, and education about, HIV and AIDS had significantly increased the death toll. Some of the harmful legislation he enacted is still in place. The condom was inflated and the message on it read: "A CONDOM TO PREVENT UNSAFE POLITICS. HELMS IS DEADLIER THAN A VIRUS." The event was captured live on the news. This was the first action of the affinity ACT group TAG (Treatment Action Guerillas). While the police were called, no one was arrested, and the group was allowed to take the condom down, though they did receive a parking ticket. The event was dramatized, with fictionalized characters, in a 2019 episode of the FX television series POSE.

Ashes Actions
In October 1992 and October 1996, during displays of the NAMES Project AIDS Memorial Quilt and just before presidential elections, ACT UP activists held two Ashes Actions. Inspired by a passage in David Wojnarowicz's 1991 memoir Close to the Knives, these actions scattered the ashes of people who had died of AIDS, including Wojnarowicz and activist Connie Norman, on the White House lawn, in protest of the federal government's inadequate response to AIDS.

Canada

Vancouver 
Formed in 1989, ACT UP Vancouver began at a public meeting to determine how to respond to the government’s inaction on the AIDS crisis, and focused their activism on the provincial political crises surrounding AIDS. They organized and participated in various protests, including the Les Misérables demonstration to protest then provincial Prime Minister Bill Vander Zalm, which brought together a diverse range of activist groups. Despite its impact, the organization eventually dissolved around 1991, following their State of the Province protest. They stated their dissolution was not due to a lack of commitment from members, but rather a lack of expertise and negative press stemming from arrests, which led to other organizations distancing themselves from ACT UP. One of the arrested members, John Kozachenko, was accused of vehicle damage, though he asserted his innocence and the charges were later dropped. Members felt the incident interfered with the groups's ability to initiate reforms in conservative Vancouver.

Montreal 
The AIDS crisis in Montreal was very pronounced and is often underrepresented in discussion about the pandemic. ACT UP worked to end the AIDS pandemic and to combat the extreme homophobia that gay men faced as a result of stigma and stereotypes. ACT UP NYC protested the Fifth International AIDS Conference in 1989 and inspired the creation of ACT UP MTL. They also confronted Montreal prisons about their high rates of HIV, which they suggested were due to condoms not being available to prisoners. 

ACT UP MTL was formed in March of 1990. Despite discouragement by the provincial government and Minister of Health, who felt that public information about AIDS prevention would encourage homosexuality and drug use, ACT UP MTL was responsible for translating English AIDS prevention resources into French and creating their own informational flyers that were accessible to Quebec's Francophone population. The chapter was also responsible for several demonstrations in a Montreal city park to raise awareness about those living with AIDS and those lost to HIV/AIDS complications. In 1994, the park was officially named Le Parc de l’Espoir and an AIDS memorial monument was constructed.

Structure of ACT UP

ACT UP was organized as effectively leaderless; there was a formal committee structure. Bill Bahlman recalls there were initially two main committees.  There was the Issues Committee that scrupulously studied the issues surrounding an advancement the group wanted to achieve and the Actions Committee that would plan a Zap or Demonstration to achieve that particular goal. This was intentional on Larry Kramer's part: he describes it as "democratic to a fault." It followed a committee structure with each committee reporting to a coordinating committee meeting once a week. Actions and proposals were generally brought to the coordinating committee and then to the floor for a vote, but this wasn't required - any motion could be brought to a vote at any time. Gregg Bordowitz, an early member, said of the process:

This is how grassroots, democratic politics work. To a certain extent, this is how democratic politics is supposed to work in general. You convince people of the validity of your ideas. You have to go out there and convince people.

This is not to say that it was in practice purely anarchic or democratic. Bordowitz and others admit that certain people were able to communicate and defend their ideas more effectively than others. Although Larry Kramer is often labeled the first "leader" of ACT UP, as the group matured, those people that regularly attended meetings and made their voice heard became conduits through which smaller "affinity groups" would present and organize their ideas. Leadership changed hands frequently and suddenly.
 Some of the Committees were:
 Issues Committee
 Action Committee
 Finance Committee
 Outreach Committee
 Treatment and Data Committee
 Media Committee
 Graphics Committee
 Housing Committee
Note: As ACT UP had no formal organizing plan, the titles of these committees are somewhat variable and some members remember them differently than others.

In addition to Committees, there were also Caucuses, bodies set up by members of particular communities to create space to pursue their needs. Among those active in the late 1980s and/or early 1990s were the Women's Caucus (sometimes referred to as the Women's Committee) and the Latino/Latina Caucus.

Along with committees and caucuses, ACT UP New York relied heavily on "affinity groups."  These groups often had no formal structure, but were centered on specific advocacy issues and personal connections, often within larger committees.  Affinity groups supported overall solidarity in larger, more complex political actions through the mutual support provided to members of the group.  Affinity groups often organized to perform smaller actions within the scope of a larger political action, such as the "Day of Desperation," when the Needle Exchange group presented NY City Health Department officials with thousands of used syringes they had collected through their exchange (contained in water cooler bottles).

Gran Fury 
Gran Fury functioned as the anonymous art collective that produced all of the artistic media for ACT UP. The group remained anonymous because it allowed the collective to function as a cohesive unit without any one voice being singled out. The mission of the group was to bring an end to the AIDS Crisis by making reference to the issues plaguing society at large, especially homophobia and the lack of public investment in the AIDS epidemic, through bringing art works into the public sphere in order to reach the maximum audience. The group often faced censorship in their proceedings, including being rejected for public billboard space and being threatened with censorship in art exhibitions. When faced with this censorship, Gran Fury often posted their work illegally on the walls of the streets.

DIVA-TV
DIVA-TV, an acronym for "Damned Interfering Video Activist Television," was an affinity group within ACT UP that videotaped and documented AIDS activism. Its founding members are Catherine Gund, Ray Navarro, Ellen Spiro, Gregg Bordowitz, Robert Beck, Costa Pappas, Jean Carlomusto, Rob Kurilla, George Plagianos. One of their early works is "Like a Prayer" (1991), documenting the 1989 ACT UP protests at St. Patrick's Cathedral against New York Cardinal O'Connor's position on AIDS and contraception. In the video, Ray Navarro, an ACT UP/DIVA TV activist, serves as the narrator, dressed up as Jesus. The documentary aims to show mass media bias as it juxtaposes original protest footage with those images shown on the nightly news.

Although less as a "collective" after 1990, DIVA TV continued documenting (over 700 camera hours) the direct actions of ACT UP, activists, and the community responses to HIV/AIDS, producing over 160 video programs for public access television channels - as the weekly series "AIDS Community Television" from 1991 to 1996 and from 1994 to 96 the weekly call-in public access series "ACT UP Live"; film festival screenings; and continuing on-line documentation and streaming internet webcasts. The video activism of DIVA TV ultimately switched media in 1997 with the establishing and continuing development of the ACT UP (New York) website.   The most recent DIVA TV-genre video program documenting the history and activism of ACT UP (New York) is the feature-length documentary: "Fight Back, Fight AIDS: 15 Years of ACT UP" (2002), screened at the Berlin Film Festival and exhibited worldwide. DIVA TV programs and camera-original videotapes are currently re-mastered, archived and preserved, and publicly accessible in the collection of the "AIDS Video Activist Video Preservation Project" at the New York Public Library.

Institutional independence
ACT UP had an early debate about whether to register the organization as a 501(c)(3) nonprofit in order to allow contributors tax exemptions. Eventually they decided against it, because as Maria Maggenti said, "they didn't want to have anything to do with the government." This kind of uncompromising ethos characterized the group in its early stages; eventually it led to a split between those in the group who wanted to remain wholly independent and those who saw opportunities for compromise and progress by "going inside [the institutions and systems they were fighting against]."

Later years
ACT UP, while extremely prolific and certainly effective at its peak, suffered from extreme internal pressures over the direction of the group and of the AIDS crisis. After the action at NIH, these tensions resulted in an effective severing of the Action Committee and the Treatment and Data Committee, which reformed itself as the Treatment Action Group (TAG). Several members describe this as a "severing of the dual nature of ACT UP."

In 2000, ACT UP/Chicago was inducted into the Chicago Gay and Lesbian Hall of Fame.

ACT UP chapters continue to meet and protest, albeit with a smaller membership.  ACT UP/NY and ACT UP/Philadelphia are particularly robust, with other chapters active elsewhere.

Housing Works, New York's largest AIDS service organization and Health GAP, which fights to expand treatment for people with AIDS throughout the world, are direct outgrowths of ACT UP.

Factionalism in San Francisco
In 2000, ACT UP/Golden Gate changed its name to Survive AIDS, to avoid confusion with ACT UP/San Francisco (ACT UP/SF). The two had previously split apart in 1990, but continued to share the same essential philosophy. In 1994, ACT UP/SF began rejecting the scientific consensus regarding the cause of AIDS and the connection to HIV, and the two groups became openly hostile to each other, with mainstream gay and AIDS organizations also condemning ACT UP/SF. The group would link up with People For the Ethical Treatment of Animals against animal research into AIDS cures. Restraining orders have been granted after the organization physically attacked AIDS charities that help HIV-positive patients, and activists have been found guilty of misdemeanor charges laid after threatening phone calls to journalists and public health officials.

See also
Organizations
 ActUp/RI: the Rhode Island chapter
 Bash Back!: group of "radical queers" influenced by ACT UP
 Fed Up Queers: group founded through ACT UP
 Fierce Pussy: NYC lesbian feminist art collective involved with ACT UP promotion and AIDS awareness
 Housing Works
 Lesbian Avengers
 Queer Nation: group founded after meetings between members of ACT UP NYC and MassActOut

People
 Chris Bartlett (activist): member of ACT UP Philadelphia.
 J. Quinn Brisben
 Spencer Cox: member of ACT UP New York
 David B. Feinberg
 Robert Garcia: member of ACT UP New York
 Gregg Gonsalves
 Keith Haring: New York artist whose Silence=Death work later became a theme used by ACT UP around 1987
 Marsha P. Johnson: Stonewall veteran, participant in meetings and actions with ACT UP New York, Boston, MassActOut, and what would become the ACT UP Presidential Project in New Hampshire
 Larry Kramer: playwright, founding member of Gay Men's Health Crisis, early member of ACT UP New York
 Kiyoshi Kuromiya: member of ACT UP Philadelphia
 Didier Lestrade: ACT UP Paris co-founder
 Luke Montgomery: member of ACT UP Seattle
 Maria Maggenti: member of ACT UP New York, filmmaker and documentarian, director of The Incredibly True Adventure of Two Girls in Love, participant in the ACT UP Oral History Project Mary Patten: member of ACT UP Chicago
 Michael Petrelis: co-founding member of ACT UP New York, helped organize chapters in several cities nationwide, including the ACT UP Presidential Project; founding member of Queer Nation
 Hunter Reynolds: member of ACT UP New York, co-founded ART + Positive
 Thierry Schaffauser: sex worker activist and writer, former member of ACT UP Paris
 Sarah Schulman: member of ACT UP New York, director of the ACT UP Oral History Project Peter Tatchell: ACT UP London founder
 Shatzi Weisberger: member of ACT UP New York

Media and Research
 How to Survive a Plague: documentary, 2012
 United in Anger: A History of ACT UP: documentary, 2012
 Small Town Rage: Fighting Back in the Deep South: documentary, 2017
 BPM (Beats per Minute): film (about ACT UP Paris), 2017
 the AIDS activist project: documentary book, 2018
 Let the Record Show: A Political History of ACT UP New York, 1987-1993, book by Sarah Schulman, 2020
 To Make the Wounded Whole: The African American Struggle Against HIV/AIDS, book by Dan Royles with material on ACT UP Philadelphia, 2020
 Deborah B. Gould, Moving Politics. Emotion and Act Up's Fight Against AIDS.

References

Works cited
 ACT UP/New York Women and AIDS Book Group (1990). "Women, AIDS, and Activism." South End Press.
 ACT UP/New York Women and AIDS Book Group (1993). "La Mujer, el SIDA, y el Activismo." South End Press.
 Brier, Jennifer (2009). "Infectious Ideas: U.S. Political Responses to the AIDS Crisis." University of North Carolina Press.
 Laurence, Leslie (1997). "Outrageous Practices: How Gender Bias Threatens Women's Health." Rutgers University Press.
 

Further reading
 ACT UP/Boston (David Stitt) collection, 1986-1994 and the ACT UP / Boston (Raymond Schmidt and Stephen Skuce) collection, 1987-2007 (bulk 1988-1995) are housed at the Northeastern University Libraries, Archives and Special Collections Department, Boston, MA.
 AIDS Activist Videotape Collection, 1983-2000 (630 VHS tapes) is housed at the New York Public Library Manuscripts and Archives Division.
 Robert Garcia Papers, 1988-1993 (9 cubic feet) are housed at the Cornell University Library.
 Women's Action Coalition Records, 1991-1997 (8 linear feet) are housed at the New York Public Library Manuscripts and Archives Division.
 ACT UP New York records, 1969, 1982-1997, Manuscripts and Archives, New York Public Library.
 Photographs and film regarding ACT UP New York and The Costas, 1987-1991, 2008, Manuscripts and Archives, New York Public Library.
 AIDS Activist Videotape Collection at the New York Public Library 
  Documentary "ACT UP, Fight Back, Fight AIDS: 15 Years of ACT UP" (2002)
  Documentary, "UNITED IN ANGER: A History of ACT UP" (2012), by Jim Hubbard & Sarah Schulman
 OutWeek Internet Archive
 Bill Bytsura ACT UP Photography Collection at The Fales Library & Special Collections of NYU
 Alan Klein papers at The Fales Library & Special Collections of NYU
 Jay Blotcher papers at The Fales Library & Special Collections of NYU
 "The Making of an AIDS Activist: Larry Kramer" and "ACT UP", pp. 162–166, Johansson, Warren and Percy, William A.  Outing:  Shattering the Conspiracy of Silence.  New York and London: Haworth Press, 1994.
 "AIDS Assaults Courts Controversy with Andrew Cornell Robinson's Obscene Ceramics", SOWEBO, ACT UP Exhibition, Baltimore, MD. 1991 Group Show & ACT UP benefit courts controversy, Harry Newspaper, Baltimore, MD, July 1991, Vol 2, p. 1
 Curley, Mallory. A Cookie Mueller Encyclopedia'', Randy Press, 2010.

External links
 ACT UP New York
 Larry Kramer Papers. Yale Collection of American Literature, Beinecke Rare Book and Manuscript Library.

HIV/AIDS activism
Health and disability rights organizations in the United States
LGBT political advocacy groups in the United States
HIV/AIDS organizations in the United States
LGBT organizations based in New York City
LGBT history in San Francisco
Organizations established in 1987
1987 establishments in New York City
1987 establishments in the United States
Critics of the Catholic Church